"Joy of My Life" is a 1997 song written and originally recorded by American musician John Fogerty. It was released on his 1997 fifth solo album Blue Moon Swamp. In 2022, the song was released as a single by country music singer Chris Stapleton as a single from his album Starting Over.

History
The tenth track on Blue Moon Swamp, "Joy of My Life," was written, produced and arranged by Fogerty, engineered by John Lowson and mixed by Bob Clearmountain. It is a conversational song about his wife Julie, and the first love song Fogerty has written unless "Long As I Can See the Light" is counted. The tune started to evolve in 1991 when Fogerty attended the Oshkosh aviation show in Wisconsin. When the organizers asked "How's Julie?" Fogerty always answered "Well' she's the joy of my life". Then the organizers: "You're always saying 'She's the joy of my life'. You should write a song." After getting serious with the dobro in 1992, Fogerty wrote the riff for the song at the Kern River draining an area of the southern Sierra Nevada mountains northeast of Bakersfield in California. The words started coming after returning back home, putting the kids down and lying in bed with his wife. Fogerty also stated he sings "Joy of My Life" to his wife every night. Eventually, it became John Fogerty's first love song.

Personnel

 Dobro, bouzouki (Irish), acoustic guitar, vocals: John Fogerty
 Bass: Bob Glaub
 Drums: Kenny Aronoff
 Claves, tambourine: Luis Conté

Chris Stapleton cover 

On March 22, 2022, country singer Chris Stapleton released his version of the song as a single. The song was originally included on his 2020 album Starting Over. After being released as a single it charted at number 27 on the US Hot Country Songs chart.

Charts

Weekly charts

Year-end charts

Certifications

References

1997 songs
Songs written by John Fogerty
John Fogerty songs
Chris Stapleton songs